Digital transmission hierarchy may refer to:
Plesiochronous Digital Hierarchy (PDH)
Synchronous Digital Hierarchy